"Shadow Game" is the fourth television play episode of the second season of the American television series CBS Playhouse. The episode was broadcast on May 7, 1969. The plot revolves around employees as a major firm trapped in their office building during the Northeast blackout of 1965.

"Shadow Game" had many noteworthy actors and actresses in its cast, including William Shatner, Daniel Massey, William Windom, Alexandra Hay, Doris Roberts, Greg Mullavey, and Richard Dysart. The broadcast also won two Emmy awards, with Paul Bogart for directing and an award for art direction and scenic design.

Cast 
 Daniel Massey as Saul Novick
 William Shatner as Peter Hoyt
 William Windom as Art Richardson
 Carol Rossen as Jess
 Alexandra Hay as Gayle
 Richard Dysart as Jerry Arnst
 Doris Roberts as Shimmy
 Norma Crane as Patti
 Maria Tucci as Carmen
 Jane Elliot as Rita
 Jason Wingreen
 Greg Mullavey

References

External links 
 
 "Shadow Game" at CTVA

1969 American television episodes
1969 plays
CBS Playhouse episodes